Microbacterium phyllosphaerae is a bacterium from the genus Microbacterium which has been isolated from the phyllosphere of grass in Germany.

References

External links
Type strain of Microbacterium phyllosphaerae at BacDive -  the Bacterial Diversity Metadatabase	

Bacteria described in 2001
phyllosphaerae